Six Mile Run may refer to the following in the U.S. state of New Jersey:

Six Mile Run (New Jersey), a tributary of the Millstone River
Six Mile Run, New Jersey, several different but related features in Franklin Township
Six Mile Run Reformed Church, a Dutch Reformed church listed on the NRHP in Somerset County
Six Mile Run Reservoir Site, part of the Delaware and Raritan Canal State Park
Franklin Park, New Jersey, a community once known as Six Mile Run

See also
Six Mile Creek (disambiguation)